In 2009, in celebration of its 135th anniversary, the Yomiuri Shimbun formed a selection committee and, together with its readers, selected the . Three hundred sites were nominated and more than 640,000 votes were collected during the selection process. Sponsored by a number of leading companies and organisations, the initiative was supported by the Ministry of Land, Infrastructure, Transport and Tourism.

See also
 100 Landscapes of Japan (Shōwa era)
 Three Views of Japan
 100 Soundscapes of Japan
 Tourism in Japan
 Tourism Areas (Japan)
 Meisho

References

External links
  Heisei Hyakkei
  100 Landscapes of Heisei

Japanese culture
Environment of Japan
Tourism in Japan
Lists of places in Japan
Heisei period
2009 in Japan